Hamilton JournalNews was a daily broadsheet newspaper based in Hamilton, Ohio, and owned by Cox Media Group. The paper covered news in Hamilton and outlying areas. In September 2013, Cox Media Group Ohio announced that, effective November 1, the Hamilton JournalNews would be merged with The Middletown Journal into a new paper, the Journal-News.

Awards
The Hamilton JournalNews brought award-winning news and information to readers in the Hamilton area since 1886. More than once it was named Best Newspaper in Ohio by The Ohio Society of Professional Journalists for its circulation. The paper also received the first-place General Excellence Award by the Associated Press.

History
The newspaper has a history going back to 1879:
Dec. 11, 1879 debut of the Hamilton Daily News
Dec. 20, 1886 debut of the Daily Democrat (an upgrade of the weekly Butler County Democrat)
June 18, 1902 debut of the Hamilton Daily Sun
Aug. 12, 1907 merger of dailies Democrat and Sun form the Hamilton Democrat-Sun
Jan. 8, 1908 name change of Democrat-Sun to Hamilton Evening Journal, the Evening Journal becomes one of 18 charter members of the Associated Press
Feb. 6, 1933 merger of the Evening Journal and Daily News to form the Hamilton Journal-News
Nov. 1, 2013 merger of dailies Hamilton JournalNews and Middletown Journal into the new Journal-News.

References

External links

 Official Site
Official mobile site
 Hamilton Journal-News.com official Facebook page

Defunct newspapers published in Ohio
Cox Newspapers
Hamilton, Ohio
1886 establishments in Ohio